The UCI Cycling World Championships organised by the  (UCI) and to be held every four years in the year preceding the Olympic Games, brings together various disciplines of cycling for them to be held as part of one event, including the UCI Road World Championships, UCI Mountain Bike World Championships and UCI Track Cycling World Championships.

The inaugural edition is scheduled to be held between 3 and 13 August 2023 in Glasgow, and across Scotland.

The 2027 edition is to be held in Haute-Savoie in France.

Championships and locations
The 2023 UCI Cycling World Championships will host 13 individual UCI World Championships, and be the biggest ever cycling event. It has been confirmed that the below events will feature.

The 2027 edition in the French Alps will include 19 disciplines, including gravel and junior worlds, as well as those featuring in 2023.

Notes

References

External links 
 

Union Cycliste Internationale